The Synya is a river in Yamalo-Nenets Autonomous Okrug, Russia.

The Synya flows across the Shuryshkarsky District.

Course 
The Synya is a left tributary of the Ob river. The river flows initially southwards, then bends and flows eastwards, within a wide floodplain located at the northwestern end of the West Siberian Plain.

Tributaries  
The river is fed predominantly by snow and is frozen between October and May.

Fauna 
The main fish species in the river are omul, peled, broad whitefish, sig, and tugun.

See also
List of rivers of Russia

References

External links
Большая вода в Овгорте. Река Сыня отступает
В Овгорте река Сыня выходит из берегов. Но ее уже ожидали
Rivers of Yamalo-Nenets Autonomous Okrug
West Siberian Plain